The Philippine Coast Guard (PCG) is recognized as the third armed uniformed service of the country attached to the Philippines' Department of Transportation, tasked primarily with enforcing laws within Philippine waters, conducting maritime security operations, safeguarding life and property at sea, and protecting marine environment and resources; similar to coast guard units around the world. In case of a declaration of war, the Coast Guard shall also serve as an attached service of the Department of National Defense.

It currently maintains a presence throughout the archipelago, with thirteen Coast Guard Districts, fifty-four CG Stations and over one hundred ninety Coast Guard Sub-Stations, from Basco, Batanes to Bongao, Tawi-Tawi.

History

Colonial era history 
The Philippine Coast Guard is the oldest and only humanitarian armed service in the Philippines. Its beginnings could be traced back to the early 20th century when coast guarding was related to the protection of the customs services of the country and in patrolling the coastlines and harbors.

When the Americans came in 1898, one of the first steps that the military government undertook was the reopening of the port and customs facilities of Manila. Soon after, the civilian Insular Government, through the Philippine Commission, enacted a law on October 17, 1901, that created the Bureau of Coast Guard and Transportation, which was placed under the Department of Commerce and Police. The Captain of the Port was designated as Bureau Director.

Recognition of the difficulty of administering such a vast island area without reliable government transportation resulted in the requirements to establish a transportation system for government services. The resulting report recommended purchase of 21 small steamers to establish 21 circuits supporting communication between provincial capitals and coastal towns as well as prevent smuggling and landing contraband. The average circuit would be . . Two small stern paddle steamers were recommended for river use on the Cayagen River and the Rio Grande de Mindanao and connected lakes. The bureau concentrated its early days on the contracts for the fifteen vessels with the result ten were to be built by Farnham, Boyd & Company in Shanghai, China and five by Uraga Dock Company in Uraga, Japan.

The ten Chinese contracted cutters were Balabac, Basilan, Busuanga, Corregidor, Luzon, Masbate, Negros, Palawan, Polillo, and Tablas. The five Uraga cutters were to be Marinduque and Romblon, which were delivered, and Bohol, Cebu, and Jolo which were cancelled after serious deficiencies were found on delivery of Marinduque and Romblon. The China built cutters began arriving in Manila by mid 1902 and were found to generally meet requirements. The Uraga built cutters, arriving in January and April 1903, had serious defects, to the extent the inspector in Japan was dismissed for negligence, and costly negotiations led to cancellation of the three others that were in process of completion. Five additional cutters were ordered from China, those being Leyte, Mindanao, Mindoro, Panay, and Samar.

The lighthouse service was placed under the Bureau. In 1902, the Coast Guard fleet of 15 steamers from China and Japan was established and were assigned for the lighthouse service inspection trips of top government officials, for transport to Culion Island, for patrolling against illegal entry of aliens, and for troop movement of the Philippine Constabulary.

The Bureau of Coast Guard and Transportation was abolished on October 26, 1905, and the Bureau of Navigation took over its functions. The Bureau of Navigation was authorized to create a commissioned and enlisted service, and to adopt its own manual of court martial patterned after the US Navy.

Subsequently, however, the Bureau was also abolished on December 19, 1913, and the organization and its functions were transferred to the Bureau of Customs and the Bureau of Public Works until the establishment of the Commonwealth Government.

Postwar era history 
After gaining independence from the United States shortly after the end of World War II, the Philippine government transferred some of the coast guard functions, such as the revenue cutter and lighthouse services, to the Philippine Naval Patrol, which eventually became the Philippine Navy. A Coast Guard unit was activated within the Philippine Navy to implement these functions.

On August 6, 1967, the Philippine Congress enacted Republic Act 5173 of the Philippine Coast Guard Law, which made the PCG a major unit of the Philippine Navy under a flag officer. The PCG was activated on October 10, 1967, and its coast guard functions were transferred from the navy.

Contemporary history 
The civilian nature of the PCG functions led to the separation of the Coast Guard from the Philippine Navy on March 30, 1998, by virtue of Executive Order 475 signed by President Fidel Ramos. The Order effectively transferred the PCG from the Department of National Defense to the Office of the President, and eventually to the Department of Transportation and Communications (DOTC) on April 15, 1998, by virtue of Executive Order 477.

These executive orders provided inter alia that the PCG shall continue to be the agency primarily responsible for the promotion of safety of life and property at sea and the protection of the maritime environment as mandated under the Philippine Coast Guard Law and Presidential Decrees 600, 601, 602, and 979, as a mended.

The transformation of the PCG into a non-military organization has a tremendous impact and significance. Its civilian character has allowed it to receive offers of vessels, equipment, technology, services, cooperation and other needed assistance from other countries, something which would not be readily offered to a military agency.

With enactment of Republic Act 9993, also known as the Coast Guard Law of 2009, as well as its implementing rules and regulations, the PCG has been vested with the necessary authority and responsibility to perform preventive measures in ensuring the safety of merchant vessels. The new law also strengthened PCG's authority to meet new challenges and increasing demands for marine resources, technological advancement and climate change. Further, the law has defined the PCG's rightful niche in the bureaucracy as the premier maritime agency and its vital role in nation building.

Organization
The Philippine Coast Guard is led by the Commandant of the Philippine Coast Guard, and directly reports to the Secretary of Transportation in maritime law enforcement, and also reports to the Secretary of National Defense in wartime. The Commandant is assisted by the Deputy Commandant for Administration and the Deputy Commandant for Operations, both holders of the rank of Vice Admiral.

Leadership
Commander-in-Chief: Pres. Bongbong Marcos
Secretary of Transportation (SoTr):  Jaime J. Bautista
Undersecretary for Maritime, DoTr: Elmer Francisco U. Sarmiento 
Commandant, Philippine Coast Guard (Comdt, PCG): CG Admiral Artemio M. Abu
Deputy Commandant for Administration: CG VADM Rolando Lizor N. Punzalan
Deputy Commandant for Operations: CG VADM Ronnie Gil L. Gavan 
Chief of Coast Guard Staff: CG COMMO Tito Alvin G. Andal

Commandants of the Philippine Coast Guard
The list shows the following officeholders who served as the commandant of the Philippine Coast Guard since its foundation in 1967.

Ranks
The Philippine Coast Guard ranks are:
Commissioned Officer

Non Commissioned Officer/Enlisted

National Headquarters Command Group
Office of the Commandant
Office of the Deputy Commandant for Administration
Office of the Deputy Commandant for Operations
Chief of Coast Guard Staff
Secretary of Coast Guard Staff

Coast Guard Central Directorial Staff
Deputy Chief of Coast Guard Staff for Human Resource Management CG-1
Deputy Chief of Coast Guard Staff for Intelligence CG-2
Deputy Chief of Coast Guard Staff for Operations CG-3
Deputy Chief of Coast Guard Staff for Logistics CG-4
Deputy Chief of Coast Guard Staff for International Affairs CG-5
Deputy Chief of Coast Guard Staff for Comptrollership CG-6
Deputy Chief of Coast Guard Staff for Civil Relations Service CG-7
Deputy Chief of Coast Guard Staff for Maritime Safety Services CG-8
Deputy Chief of Coast Guard Staff for Marine Environment Protection CG-9
Deputy Chief of Coast Guard Staff for Ships and Aircraft Engineering CG-10
Deputy Chief of Coast Guard Staff for Maritime Communications, Weapons, Electronics and Information System CG-11
Deputy Chief of Coast Guard Staff for Education and Training CG-12
Deputy Chief of Coast Guard Staff for Maritime Security Services CG-14
Deputy Chief of Coast Guard Staff for Strategic Studies and Modernization CG-15

Support Services
Legal Service
Legislative Liaison Affairs
Medical Service
Dental Service
Chaplain Service
Command Center
Public Affairs Office
Headquarters Support Group
Office of the Command Master Chief Petty Officer
Project Management Office
Real Estate Management Office
Special Service Office
Adjutant Office
Receiving Station
Gender and Development

Functional Commands
Maritime Safety Services Command
Marine Environmental Protection Command
Marine Security and Law Enforcement Command
K9 Force
Security and Border Protection Service
Sea Marshall Group
Investigation and Detection Management Service
Surface Patrol Force
PCG i-ACT

Coast Guard Districts
The Coast Guard Districts are responsible for securing their respective locations, while launching maritime safety operations, humanitarian assistance, maintaining law enforcement and environment security within their respective area of operations.
Coast Guard District Northeastern Luzon
Coast Guard District Northwestern Luzon
Coast Guard District National Capital Region – Central Luzon
Coast Guard District Southern Tagalog
Coast Guard District Palawan
Coast Guard District Bicol
Coast Guard District Eastern Visayas
Coast Guard District Western Visayas
Coast Guard District Central Visayas
Coast Guard District Southern Visayas
Coast Guard District Northern Mindanao
Coast Guard District Northeastern Mindanao
Coast Guard District Southeastern Mindanao
Coast Guard District Southwestern Mindanao
Coast Guard District Bangsamoro Autonomous Region in Muslim Mindanao

Units
The Philippine Coast Guard's functional command units include:
The Maritime Security Command (MARSECOM) - responsible for overall territorial patrol, surveillance and law enforcement operations of the PCG.
Marine Environmental Protection Command (MEPCOM) - responsible for overall maritime environmental enforcement, protection and control through maritime monitoring and enforcing maritime regulation operations.
Maritime Safety Services Command (MSSC) - responsible for overall maritime surveillance for the safety of ships, navigational surveillance and ensures maritime freedom of navigation.

The PCG used to be with the Armed Forces of the Philippines under the Philippine Navy before it was transferred to the Department of Transportation. The PCG is considered the fourth armed and uniformed service of the country primarily tasked with enforcing all applicable laws within the Philippine waters, conducting maritime security operations, safeguarding of life and property at sea and protecting the marine environment and resources.

Due to the 2004 Super Ferry 14 bombing incident in 2004, the PCG activated the Task Force Sea Marshals a composite team from the PCG, AFP and Philippine National Police. These Sea Marshals ride on board the passenger ferries traveling to and from Manila and other ports, and maintain a security presence aboard these ferries.

Coast Guard Aviation Force
The Coast Guard Aviation Force (CGAF), then known as Coast Guard Air Group was formally activated on May 18, 1998, during the incumbency of Commodore Manuel I de Leon PCG as Commandant, Philippine Coast Guard. Accordingly, Commander Noel O Monte PCG was designated as its first Commander holding office at the former PADC Hangar Nr. 3, Domestic Airport Complex, Pasay.

On January 22, 1999, after eight months of existence, PCGAG acquired its first aircraft, a BN Islander from the Philippine National Oil Company – Energy Development Corporation (PNOC – EDC). After six months of intensive inspection and rehabilitation, it was commissioned into Coast Guard service on June 26, 1999, as PCG–251. In June 1999, the first helicopter, a MBB BO-105CB was acquired from PADC and commissioned with the tail number PCG–1636. Another aircraft, a Cessna 421B "Golden Eagle" was acquired without cost from the Bureau of Soils and Water Management sometime in the early part of 2000. However, due to budgetary constraints, the aircraft rehabilitation is not yet completed to date. In the same year, another BN Islander with the tail number PCG–684 was acquired. It was commissioned and activated in June 2002 after it underwent rehabilitation. On March 30, 2001, the helm of the CGAG was transferred to Captain Lino H Dabi PCG. In search of a bigger home for its growing inventory, on November 21, 2002, with the support of Pantaleon Alvarez, the Secretary of Transportation and Communications, the Manila International Airport Authority allowed CGAG to occupy its present location. Extensive renovation work was undertaken to make the hangar suitable as the nerve center of all Coast Guard Air Operations. On March 28, 2003, the CGAG acquired another BO – 105C helicopter from PADC and was commissioned into the service as PCG – 163 during the Group's 5th Founding Anniversary.

With the intense need to have the capability to extract survivors from water, the said helicopter was fitted with a rescue hoist through the courtesy of the Japan International Cooperation Agency. Another significant milestone unfolded in the history of the group when PCG leadership was turned over to Vice Admiral Arthur Gosingan PCG. Through the endorsement of the CGOF Commander, Rear Admiral Damian Carlos PCG in recognizing the importance of the air unit in coast guard operations and their outstanding accomplishments granted the aviators their most aspired yearning of their careers by approving the group's position paper on the Command Pilot Rating. This enabled aviators to have an equal opportunity with officers that acquired a Command at a Sea Badge to assume positions of higher responsibilities in the Coast Guard hierarchy.

Coast Guard Special Operations Force

The Philippine Coast Guard's Special Operations Force (CGSOF) is the special forces unit of the Philippine Coast Guard, founded in 1972. The CGSOF performs underwater operations, domestic counter-terrorism and other law enforcement operations. Some of their notable deployments and accomplishments include the operations to the Laoag Air crash at Manila Bay, the aftermath of the 2004 SuperFerry 14 bombing, the Search and Recovery operations to the ill-fated M/V Princess of the Stars incident, and the Battle of Marawi.

Philippine Coast Guard Auxiliary
The Philippine Coast Guard Auxiliary is the civilian support group of the Philippine Coast Guard. Although a volunteer, civilian organization, the PCGA uses a military structure for organizational purposes. Like other volunteer sea rescue organizations around the world, it performs non-military and non-police activities in support of its national navy or coast guard. This endeavor includes search and rescue, environmental protection, disaster relief, community service, and marine safety.

The ranks of the Philippine Coast Guard Auxiliary follow those of the Philippine Coast Guard.

Operation Brotherhood Montessori Center has a few officers that serve as Leadership Training teachers and CAT teachers from this Coast Guard branch.

Philippine Coast Guard Officers’ Basic Education and Training Center 
Like the Training and Doctrine Command (TRADOC)’s Officer Candidate Schools (OCS) of Philippine Army, Philippine Navy and Philippine Air Force, the Philippine Coast Guard also has Philippine Coast Guard Officers’ Basic Education and Training Center (PCGOBETC) that serves as officer candidate school of PCG officer aspirants. Officer Candidates taking the Coast Guard Officers’ Course (CGOC) become Probationary Ensigns (P/ENS) and after graduation, they will be commissioned as regular officers in the organization.

Ships in service

Major maritime assets

Minor maritime assets

Aircraft in service

Recent acquisitions

Disaster Response Equipment for Philippine Coast Guard Project
The Project ensures that each of the Philippine Coast Guard's 12 Coast Guard District Headquarters will be assigned two Rubber Boats each for Rescue missions. Furthermore, all 63 Coast Guard Stations and the 237 Coast Guard Detachments will have one Aluminum Boat. Also, all 63 Coast Guard Stations will be equipped with one Rigid Hull Inflatable Boat (RHIB). Other RHIBs and Rubber Boats will be assigned to PCG Special Units and Search and Rescue vessels.

All the 300 Aluminum Boats, 81 RHIBs and 50 Rubber Boats will be equipped with 2 units VHF handheld marine-type Radio, 2 units Operators' Life Vests, 6 units of Common Life Vests, 1 Megaphone and 4 units of Flares.

It is projected to minimize the instances when PCG personnel borrowing boats from fishermen, or other private entities to perform their duties during emergencies. This resulted in delays in the PCG's response time, making rescue operations less efficient.

Under this same project but under a different public bidding document, 15 units of M35 6×6 Trucks and 40 units rubber boats were purchased. 3 units of the trucks and all 40 rubber boat units are currently assigned with the National Headquarters of the PCG. The remaining 12 units of the M35 trucks are assigned to each of the 12 Coast Guard Districts. It is expected to further facilitate timely response to disaster situations.

Maritime Safety Capability Improvement Project (Phase I)
The Project aims to strengthen and further develop the coast watch/patrol and search and rescue capabilities of Philippine Coast Guard by procuring additional patrol vessels. This will support the PCG in fulfilling its mandate and in complying with the international commitments of the Philippines on maritime safety, security and environmental protection. The vessels are to be deployed in ten PCG Districts Manila, Tacloban, Zamboanga, Puerto Princesa, La Union, Iloilo, San Fernando (La Union), Davao, Legaspi and Cagayan de Oro.

This JICA Project supports PCG, who is responsible of Maritime Safety, to enhance its capabilities to quickly and appropriately respond to coastal maritime incidents, such as search and rescue, maritime law enforcement, etc., by providing Multi-Role Responsive Vessels (MRRVs), thereby increasing the vessel/maritime area rate of each of the 12 districts. The Project is also in line with development policy of the Philippines and assistance strategy of Japan. Therefore, it is relevant that JICA supports the implementation of the Project.

During Japan's Minister of Foreign Affairs visit to Philippines in January 2013, Minister Fumio Kishida underscored the role of Japan as the Philippines' strategic ally. In the conference, he stressed Japan would provide 10 patrol vessels to the Philippine Coast Guard on a loan basis. Shinzo Abe confirmed that 10 patrol boats will be swiftly donated to the Coast Guard. President Aquino and Prime Minister Abe witnessed the signing of a $187-million (18.732 billion yen) loan for the Philippines’ acquisition of multi-role response vessels to boost the capability of its coast guard to conduct maritime patrols.

Maritime Safety Capability Improvement Project for the Philippine Coast Guard (Phase II)

The project involves the acquisition of two heavy weather, high endurance 94-meter Offshore Patrol Vessels (OPVs), to provide the PCG with vessels with a cruising range capability of 4,000 nautical miles, can be used in Sea-State 6 (wave height of up to 6 meters) in rough sea condition, and are capable to conduct continuous maritime patrol up to 15 days at 15 knots. Each vessel, as claimed by PCG, will enable them to recover as much as 500 passengers in the event of a maritime disaster, as well as provide the country with wider maritime coverage for strategic and national security purposes.
Given these upgraded vessel capacities, the project now costs PhP8 billion and with the NEDA Board approval, are expected to be delivered by 2022.

Philippine Ports and Coast Guard Capability Development Project
The project aims to strengthen the Philippine Coast Guard's capability to promote safety of life, protect the marine environment and enforce maritime laws through procurement of four brand new 24-meter OCEA FPV 72MKII patrol boats, 20 fast patrol boats, and one 82-meter 270 MKII offshore patrol vessel.

The budget from this project came from the loan balance of a French loan that financed the cancelled Greater Maritime Access Ports Project of the Arroyo administration.

Maritime Disaster Response Helicopter Acquisition Project
The project involves the procurement of seven Maritime Disaster Response (MDR) helicopters for the Philippine Coast Guard to strengthen and expand their MDR capabilities during maritime incidents and natural disasters and calamities. The project will also involve the training of pilots and technical crew, procurement of mission equipment, procurement of maintenance tools and spare parts for five years, and the construction of hangars for the helicopters and offices for the pilots and technical crew. It was supposed to be funded by the Credit Agricole of Germany.

In addition to the recently acquired Airbus H145 helicopters, plans were also laid out to acquire 2 units of AgustaWestland AW139 for SAR operations.

Lightweight Multi-purpose Fixed Wing Aircraft Acquisition Project
The project involves the procurement of one fixed-wing aircraft in order to increase the Coast Guard's aerial responsibilities, such as maritime patrol, search and rescue (SAR), and utility operations. Due to a limited budget, the coast guard has planned to acquire 1 or 2 units of the Cessna 208B Grand Caravan EX, with plans laid out to acquire additional units in the coming years as the aircraft is expected to replace the ageing Britten-Norman BN-2 Islander.

See also
 Armed Forces of the Philippines
 Philippine Army
 Philippine Air Force
 Philippine Navy
 Philippine Marine Corps
 Philippine National Police

References

Citations

External links

 
 History of the Philippine Coast Guard from Official website
 Department of Transportation and Communications

 
Coast guards
Department of Transportation (Philippines)
Law enforcement in the Philippines